Howard Stafford Huntsberry (born March 5, 1952) is an American R&B singer, drummer/percussionist, and actor from Pacoima, California.

Biography
In the mid-1970s, he served as drummer and male co-lead vocalist of the one-off project, The Ultimate Music Experience (T.U.M.E.), who released a self-titled album in 1975. In 1981, he became the frontman for the group Klique, a position he held through 1985, when the group released its final album.

In 1988, he released a solo album, With Love, which produced two minor hits on the Billboard R&B chart. He also starred as singer Jackie Wilson in the movie La Bamba, singing a cover of "Lonely Teardrops" which was on the soundtrack album of the same.  Incidentally, Klique's biggest hit had also been a cover of a Jackie Wilson song, "Stop Doggin' Me Around".

Paying further tribute to Jackie Wilson, he also performed Wilson's "(Your Love Keeps Lifting Me) Higher and Higher" in Ghostbusters II.

Discography

Studio albums
 With Love (MCA Records, 1988)

Singles

References

External links
 
 Discography at Discogs.

American rhythm and blues singers
American male film actors
Male actors from California
Living people
1952 births
People from Pacoima, Los Angeles